Wesley Olan Gonzales (born July 27, 1980 in Manila, Philippines) is a Filipino former professional basketball player. Gonzales last played for the Barako Bull Energy Cola before retiring after a stellar college career and a 10-year stint in the PBA.

Player Profile
At 6-foot-5, Gonzales played for the 2002 UAAP championship squad of the Ateneo de Manila University Blue Eagles, and was named co-Finals MVP, along with teammate Larry Fonacier. He was drafted 9th overall in the 2004 PBA draft by the FedEx Express. In 2006, he was traded to the San Miguel Beermen and in late 2009 he became a player of the Coca-Cola Tigers before eventually going back to Air21. On May 16, 2011, the Alaska Aces moved to shore up a critical weakness and strengthened their guard corps by acquiring Wesley in exchange for their 2010 PBA draft 4th pick overall, Elmer Espiritu.  After his stint with Barako Bull in 2014, he decided to call it quits and is now working at HSBC.

References

1980 births
Living people
Alaska Aces (PBA) players
Ateneo Blue Eagles men's basketball players
Barako Bull Energy draft picks
Barako Bull Energy players
Basketball players from Manila
Competitors at the 2003 Southeast Asian Games
Filipino men's basketball players
Magnolia Hotshots players
Philippines men's national basketball team players
San Miguel Beermen players
Shooting guards
Small forwards
Southeast Asian Games gold medalists for the Philippines
Southeast Asian Games competitors for the Philippines
Southeast Asian Games medalists in basketball